Strawberry Roan is a 1945 British drama film directed by Maurice Elvey and starring William Hartnell and Carol Raye.  The screenplay was developed from the then-popular 1932 novel of the same name by Wiltshire author A. G. Street.

Plot
Farmer Chris Lowe meets and falls in love with Molly, a dancer.  Despite being a city girl, she accepts his proposal of marriage and after the wedding goes to live on the farm.  In an attempt to ease her into farm life, Chris buys her a strawberry roan calf to look after, but she shows no interest in it, preferring to concentrate on a life of shopping, parties and generally gadding about with Chris. Being much in love and enjoying her company, he goes along with it, but it causes him to give less and less of his attention to the farm business. After one of his friends brings this home to him, he tells Molly that the farm is in financial difficulties and that things will have to change and she must accept that his first priority must be the business. She becomes upset and takes off on her horse, riding wildly until she suffers a fall. She manages to get back home but does not tell Chris about the fall. Later, she collapses and is taken to hospital where, despite an operation, she dies. Despite his friend offering to finance the farm so he can carry on, Chris decides to sell up his house and farm so that he can clear his debts, and then leave, but eventually his friends persuade him to stay on and take up the offer of a position as farm manager on what was his farm for the new owner.

Cast
 William Hartnell (credited as Billy Hartnell) as Chris Lowe
 Carol Raye as Molly Lowe
 Walter Fitzgerald as Morley
 Sophie Stewart as Mrs. Morley
 Wylie Watson as Bill Gurd
 Petula Clark as Emily
 Joan Maude as Gladys Moon
 Norman Shelley as Dr. Lambert
 John Ruddock as Dibben
 Joan Young as Mrs. Dibben
 Ellis Irving as Auctioneer
 Kynaston Reeves as Dealer

Reception
The film received mixed reviews, with Today's Cinema commenting: "While the author's theme may not emerge with any great power or clarity...the charming rural backgrounds invest the picture with a quality of comparative originality".  The Motion Picture Herald reviewer was less pleased, writing: "Praiseworthy in its aim, but just lacking in ultimate achievement...there's an uneasiness, a jumpiness about it all".

References

External links 
Strawberry Roan at BFI

Review of film at Variety

1945 films
1945 drama films
Films directed by Maurice Elvey
1940s English-language films
British black-and-white films
Films based on British novels
British drama films
Films shot at British National Studios
1940s British films